The Sigma 35 mm 1.4 DG HSM Art is a wide-angle prime lens made by the Sigma Corporation. The lens was announced at the 2012 photokina trade fair.

The lens is produced in Canon EF mount, Nikon F-mount, Pentax K mount, Sigma's own SA mount, and the Sony/Minolta AF Mount varieties, all have the same optical formula. Since the lens covers full-frame sensors and includes an ultrasonic autofocus motor, it is fully compatible with most DSLRs on which it can be mounted  physically. Reviews have noted excellent sharpness  and an overall performance on par with manufacturers such as Nikon and Canon, despite its price being significantly less than comparable offerings by those companies.

The Art series of Sigma lenses can be connected to Sigma's USB dock, allowing the lens firmware to be updated and focus micro-adjustments to be configured at four different focus distances.

See also
List of Nikon F-mount lenses with integrated autofocus motors

References

035mm f/1.4 DG HSM
Camera lenses introduced in 2013